Cool Christy is a 2002 double-CD compilation of recordings by jazz vocalist June Christy from 1945 to 1951.

Disc one
 "Tampico" (Gene Roland)
 "It's Been a Long, Long Time" (Jule Styne, Sammy Cahn)
 "It Ain't Necessarily So" (George Gershwin, Ira Gershwin)
 "How High the Moon" (Nancy Hamilton, Morgan Lewis)
 "Wrap Your Troubles in Dreams" (Harry Barris, Ted Koehler, Billy Moll)
 "I Can't Believe That You're in Love With Me" (Jimmy McHugh, Clarence Gaskill)
 "Hay Lawdy Papa" (Gene Roland)
 "Stompin' at the Savoy" (Edgar Sampson, Andy Razaf, Benny Goodman, Chick Webb)
 "Get Happy" (Harold Arlen, Ted Koehler)
 "Can't Help Lovin' Dat Man" (Jerome Kern, Oscar Hammerstein II)
 "Don't Worry 'bout Me" (Rube Bloom, Ted Koehler)
 "Mean to Me" (Roy Turk, Fred E. Ahlert)
 "Lover Man" (Jimmy Davis, Ram Ramirez, James Sherman)
 "September in the Rain" (Harry Warren, Al Dubin)
 "Sweet Lorraine" (Cliff Burwell, Mitchell Parish)
 "Make Love to Me" (Paul Mann, Stephen Weiss, Kim Gannon)
 "Supper Time" (Irving Berlin)
 "What's New?" (Bob Haggart, Johnny Burke)
 "I've Got a Guy" (Marion Sunshine)
 "I Can't Give You Anything but Love, Baby" (Jimmy McHugh, Dorothy Fields)
 "This Is Romance" (Vernon Duke, Edward Heyman)
 "Prelude to a Kiss" (Duke Ellington, Irving Gordon, Irving Mills)
 "I'm Thrilled" (Sidney Lippman, Sylvia Dee)
 "You're Blasé" (Ord Hamilton, Bruce Siever)
 "Lullaby in Rhythm" (Walter Hirsh, Benny Goodman)

Personnel

Track 1 - recorded Chicago, 4 May 1945
 June Christy - vocals
 Stan Kenton and his Orchestra
 John Carroll - trumpet
 Buddy Childers - trumpet
 John Anderson - trumpet
 Gene Roland - trumpet, arranger
 Mel Green - trumpet
 Freddie Zito - trombone
 Milt Kabak - trombone
 Marshall Ocker - trombone
 Bart Varsalona - bass trombone
 Bob Lively - alto saxophone
 Boots Mussulli - alto saxophone
 Joe Magro - tenor saxophone
 Dave Madden - tenor saxophone
 Bob Gioga - baritone saxophone
 Stan Kenton - piano
 Bob Ahern - guitar
 Max Wayne - bass
 Bob Varney - drums

Track 2 - recorded New York, 30 July 1945
 June Christy - vocals
 Stan Kenton and his Orchestra
 Buddy Childers - trumpet
 Ray Wetzel - trumpet
 John Anderson - trumpet
 Russ Burgher - trumpet
 Bob Lymperis - trumpet
 Freddie Zito - trombone
 Milt Kabak - trombone
 Jimmy Simms - trombone
 Bart Varsalona - bass trombone
 Al Anthony - alto saxophone
 Boots Mussulli - alto saxophone
 Bob Cooper - tenor saxophone
 Bill McDougald - tenor saxophone
 Bob Gioga - baritone saxophone
 Stan Kenton - piano
 Bob Ahern - guitar
 Eddie Safranski - bass
 Bob Varney - drums

Track 3 - recorded Hollywood, 20 December 1945
 June Christy - vocals
 Stan Kenton and his Orchestra
 Buddy Childers - trumpet
 Ray Wetzel - trumpet
 John Anderson - trumpet
 Russ Burgher - trumpet
 Bob Lymperis - trumpet
 Freddie Zito - trombone
 Milt Kabak - trombone
 Jimmy Simms - trombone
 Ray Klein - trombone
 Al Anthony - alto saxophone
 Boots Mussulli - alto saxophone
 Bob Cooper - tenor saxophone
 Bob Gioga - baritone saxophone
 Stan Kenton - piano
 Bob Ahern - guitar
 Boots Mussulli - alto saxophone
 Bob Cooper - tenor saxophone

Tracks 4-17 - recorded Los Angeles, December 1945
 June Christy - vocals
 Ray Wetzel - trumpet
 Gene Roland - valve trombone
 Boots Mussulli - alto saxophone
 Bob Cooper - tenor saxophone
 Pete Rugolo - piano
 Dave Barbour - guitar
 Boots Mussulli - alto saxophone
 Bob Cooper - tenor saxophone

Tracks 18-25 - recorded Los Angeles, January 1946
 June Christy - vocals
 Ray Wetzel - trumpet
 Kai Winding - trombone
 Boots Mussulli - alto saxophone
 Bob Cooper - tenor saxophone
 Buddy Cole - piano
 Eddie Safranski - bass
 Jimmy Pratt - drums

Disc two

 "The One I Love" (Isham Jones, Gus Kahn)
 "Moonglow" (Will Hudson, Eddie DeLange)
 "How Long Has This Been Going On? (George Gershwin, Ira Gershwin)
 "Rika Jika Jack" (Eric Dawson, Maxine Sullivan, Walter Hagen)
 "I'd Be Lost Without You" (Sunny Skylar)
 "It's a Pity to Say Goodnight" (Billy Reid, Mack Gordon)
 "His Feet Too Big for the Bed" (Hernan Brana, Dick Sanford, Sammy Mysels)
 "Don't Want That Man Around" (Joe Rizzo, Sam Braude, Sam Volk)
 "Across the Alley from the Alamo" (Joe Greene)
 "If I Should Lose You" (Ralph Rainger, Leo Robin)
 "Skip Rope" (Sidney Lippman, Sylvia Dee)
 "Please Be Kind" (Saul Chaplin, Sammy Cahn)
 "I Got It Bad (and That Ain't Good)" (Duke Ellington, Paul Francis Webster)
 "Curiosity" (Alex Kramer, Joan Whitney, Sam Ward)
 "He Was a Good Man as Good Men Go" (Teddy Powell)
 "Lonely Woman" (Benny Carter, Zola Sonin)
 "The Way You Look Tonight" (Jerome Kern, Dorothy Fields)
 "Everything Happens to Me" (Matt Dennis, Tom Adair)
 "I'll Remember April" (Gene de Paul, Patricia Johnston, Don Raye)
 "Get Happy" (Harold Arlen, Ted Koehler)
 "A Mile Down the Highway (There's a Toll Bridge)" (David Mann,  Bob Hilliard)
 "Do It Again" (George Gershwin, Buddy DeSylva)
 "He Can Come Back Anytime He Wants To" (Johnny Lehman)
 "Easy Street" (Alan Rankin Jones)

Personnel

Tracks 1-3 - recorded Los Angeles, January 1946
 June Christy - vocals
 Ray Wetzel - trumpet
 Kai Winding - trombone
 Boots Mussulli - alto saxophone
 Bob Cooper - tenor saxophone
 Buddy Cole - piano
 Eddie Safranski - bass
 Jimmy Pratt – drums

Track 4 - recorded Hollywood, 4 June 1946
 June Christy - vocals
 Stan Kenton and his Orchestra
 Buddy Childers - trumpet
 Ray Wetzel – trumpet
 Chico Alvarez - trumpet
 John Anderson - trumpet
 Ken Hanna – trumpet
 Kai Winding - trombone
 Miff Sines – trombone
 Milt Kabak - trombone
 Bart Varsalona - bass trombone
 Al Anthony - alto saxophone
 Boots Mussulli - alto saxophone
 Vido Musso – tenor saxophone
 Bob Cooper - tenor saxophone
 Bob Gioga - baritone saxophone
 Stan Kenton - piano
 Bob Ahern - guitar
 Eddie Safranski - bass
 Shelly Manne - drums

Track 5 - recorded Hollywood, 19 July 1946
 June Christy - vocals
 Stan Kenton and his Orchestra
 same personnel as Track 4

Track 6 - recorded Hollywood, 25 July 1946
 June Christy - vocals
 Stan Kenton and his Orchestra
 same personnel as Track 4, but Harry Forbes (trombone) replaces Milt Kabak

Track 8 - recorded Hollywood, 13 February 1947
 June Christy - vocals
 Stan Kenton and his Orchestra
 Buddy Childers - trumpet
 Ray Wetzel – trumpet
 Chico Alvarez - trumpet
 John Anderson - trumpet
 Ken Hanna – trumpet
 Kai Winding - trombone
 Skip Layton - trombone
 Milt Bernhart - trombone
 Harry Forbes - trombone
 Bart Varsalona - bass trombone
 Eddie Meyers- also saxophone
 Boots Mussulli - alto saxophone
 Vido Musso - tenor saxophone
 Bob Cooper - tenor saxophone
 Bob Gioga - baritone saxophone
 Stan Kenton - piano
 Bob Ahern - guitar
 Eddie Safranski - bass
 Shelly Manne - drums

Track 7 - recorded New York, 2 January 1947
 June Christy - vocals
 Stan Kenton and his Orchestra
 Buddy Childers - trumpet
 Ray Wetzel – trumpet
 Chico Alvarez - trumpet
 John Anderson - trumpet
 Ken Hanna – trumpet
 Kai Winding - trombone
 Skip Layton - trombone
 Harry Forbes - trombone
 Bart Varsalona - bass trombone
 Eddie Meyers- also saxophone
 Boots Mussulli - alto saxophone
 Red Dorris – tenor saxophone
 Bob Cooper - tenor saxophone
 Bob Gioga - baritone saxophone
 Stan Kenton - piano
 Bob Ahern - guitar
 Eddie Safranski - bass
 Shelly Manne - drums
 José Mangual - bongos
 Pedro Allendo - maracas
 The Pastels * Margaret Dale * Dave Lambert * Wayne Howard * Jerry Packer * Jerry Duane

Track 9 - recorded Hollywood, 28 February 1947
 June Christy - vocals
 Stan Kenton and his Orchestra
 same personnel as Track 7, but The Pastels out.

Track 10 - recorded Los Angeles, 3 March 1947
 June Christy - vocals
 Frank De Vol’s Orchestra
 Ray Linn - trumpet
 Juan Tizol – valve trombone
 Richard Perissi – French horn
 Vincent DeRosa – French horn
 Evan Vail – French horn
 Vincent De Robertis – French horn
 Skeets Herfurt - reeds
 Jules Kinsler - reeds
 Ted Romersa - reeds
 Jerome Kasper - reeds
 Ronald Pirozzi - reeds
 Felix Slatkin - violin
 Joseph Quadri - violin
 Marshall Sosson - violin
 Joachim Chassman - violin
 Buddy Cole - piano
 Al Hendrickson - guitar
 Eddie Safranski - bass
 Shelly Manne - drums
 Frank De Vol – arranger, conductor

Track 11 - recorded Los Angeles, 31 March 1947
 June Christy - vocals
 Frank De Vol’s Orchestra
 Neal Hefti - trumpet
 Zeke Zarchy - trumpet
 Dick Cathcart - trumpet
 Ray Linn - trumpet
 Juan Tizol – valve trombone
 Skeets Herfurt - reeds
 Jules Kinjsler - reeds
 Tede Romersa - reeds
 Jerome Kasper - reeds
 Ronald Pirozzi - reeds
 Buddy Cole piano
 Barney Kessel -guitar
 Eddie Safranski - bass
 Shelly Manne - drums
 Frank De Vol – arranger, conductor

Tracks 12, 13 - recorded Hollywood, 1 April 1947
 June Christy - vocals
 Stan Kenton and his Orchestra
 same personnel as Track 8.

Track 14 - recorded Hollywood, 25 September 1947
 June Christy - vocals
 Stan Kenton and his Orchestra
 Buddy Childers - trumpet
 Ray Wetzel - trumpet
 Al Porcino - trumpet
 Chico Alvarez - trumpet
 Ken Hanna - trumpet
 Milt Bernhart - trombone
 Eddie Burt - trombone
 Harry Betts - trombone
 Harry Forbes - trombone
 Bart Varsalona - bass trombone
 George Weidler - alto saxophone
 Frank Pappalardo - alto saxophone
 Bob Cooper - tenor saxophone
 Warner Weidler - tenor saxophone
 Bob Gioga - baritone saxophone
 Stan Kenton - piano
 Laurindo Almeida - guitar
 Eddie Safranski - bass
 Shelly Manne - drums
 Jack Costanzo - bongos

Track 15 - recorded Hollywood, 22 October 1947
 June Christy - vocals
 Stan Kenton and his Orchestra
 same personnel as Track 14, but Art Pepper replaces Frank Pappalardo

Track 16 - recorded Hollywood, 6 December 1947
 June Christy - vocals
 Stan Kenton and his Orchestra
 same personnel as Track 15

Tracks 17, 18 - recorded Los Angeles, 28 March 1949
 June Christy - vocals
 Bob Cooper’s Orchestra
 Buddy Childers - trumpet
 Johnny Mandel - bass trumpet
 Billy Byers - trombone
 Art Pepper – alto saxophone
 Bob Cooper – tenor saxophone
 Irv Roth baritone saxophone
 Hal Schaefer - piano
 Joe Mondragon bass
 Don Lamond - drums
 Luis Miranda – congas (track 17)
 Jasper Hornyak - violin (track 17)
 Cesare Pascarello cello (track 18)
 John Lewis – arranger (track 17)
 Bob Graettinger – arranger (track 18)

Tracks 19, 20 - recorded Los Angeles, 29 September 1949
 June Christy - vocals
 Pete Rugolo’s Orchestra
 Alex Gershunoff - flute
 Pete Rugolo piano, arranger
 Laurindo Almeida -guitar
 Don Whittaker - bass
 Jackie Mills drums
 Harry Bluestone - violin
 Dave Klein - violin
 Mishe Russell - violin
 Stan Harris - viola
 Cy Benard – viola

Tracks 21-23 - recorded Los Angeles, 11 September 1950
 June Christy - vocals
 Shorty Rogers and his Giants
 John Graas – French horn
 Gene England - tuba
 Art Pepper – also saxophone
 Bud Shank – tenor saxophone
 Bob Cooper - tenor saxophone
 Bob Gioga – baritone saxophone
 Claude Williamson - piano
 Don Bagley – bass
 Shelly Manne - drums
 Shorty Rogers – conductor, arranger

Track 24 - recorded Hollywood, 20 September 1951
 June Christy - vocals
 Stan Kenton and his Orchestra
 John Howell - trumpet
 Maynard Ferguson - trumpet
 Conte Candoli - trumpet
 Stu Williamson - trumpet
 John Copolla - trumpet
 Dick Kenney - trombone
 Harry Betts - trombone
 Bob Fitzpatrick - trombone
 Bill Russo
 George Roberts – bass trombone
 Bud Shank – alto saxophone
 Art Pepper – alto saxophone
 Bob Cooper – tenor saxophone
 Bart Caldarell – tenor saxophone
 Bob Gioga - saxophone
 Stan Kenton      - piano
 Ralph Blaze - guitar
 Don Bagley - bass
 Shelly Manne - drums

June Christy albums
2002 compilation albums
Vocal jazz compilation albums